NGC 5256 is an object that contains two disc galaxies, that are colliding into each other. It is located in the constellation Ursa Major, and was discovered by William Herschel on 12 May 1787. The two nuclei of the galaxies are separated by about 13,000 light-years. NGC 5256 is located at about 420 million light-years away from the Earth.

NGC 5256 is also known as Markarian 266 and is one of the Markarian galaxies, included in the Markarian Survey due to its high amount of ultraviolet emission. However, it is also a luminous infrared galaxy (LIRG); most of its energy is emitted in the infrared range.

See also 
 List of NGC objects (5001–6000)
 List of NGC objects

References

External links 
 
 

Interacting galaxies
Luminous infrared galaxies
Ursa Major (constellation)
5256
08632
48192
Markarian 0266